Darreh Murti (also Romanized as Darreh Mūrtī; also known as Darreh Mūrdī) is a village in Soghan Rural District, Soghan District, Arzuiyeh County, Kerman Province, Iran. At the 2006 census, its population was 36, in 13 families.

References 

Populated places in Arzuiyeh County